Elmore Joseph Andre, also known as E.J. André (August 14, 1908 – September 6, 1984) was an American writer, director, and actor on stage, film and television, perhaps best known for portraying Uncle Jed on Little House on the Prairie, and Eugene Bullock on Dallas.

Career
Andre's early work included writing and directing productions for the Nine O'Clock Players, which performed for disabled children.

His film debut came later at the age of 48 at the urging of his agent, beginning with a role as the Sheik of Hazerath in Cecil B. DeMille's The Ten Commandments (1956).

During his 28-year film and television career he was a notable character actor, cast in the role of uncle, grandfather, doctor, farmer, educator, politician, clergyman, judge, and the like. Film appearances include Omar Khayyam (1957), Battle at Bloody Beach (1961), Red Nightmare (1962), The Shakiest Gun in the West (1968), The Arrangement (1969), The Lawyer (1970), Papillon (1973), Haunts (1976), Nickelodeon (1976), The Lincoln Conspiracy (1977), Magic (1978), Nickle Mountain (1984), and a posthumous 1987 appearance in Evil Town, among others.

On television, he was a familiar face as guest cast in 77 Sunset Strip, 87th Precinct, Adam 12, The Alfred Hitchcock Hour, The Big Valley, Blue Light, Bonanza, Bronco, Burke's Law, Cannon, Charlie's Angels, Dallas, The Dakotas, Death Valley Days, The Flying Nun, The Fugitive, Greatest Heroes of the Bible, The Green Hornet, Gunsmoke, Harry O, I Dream of Jeannie, Laredo, Little House on the Prairie, Love American Style, Mannix, Nichols, Night Gallery, Perry Mason, Peter Gun, Petticoat Junction, Quincy, M.E., Shane, Shirley Temple's Storybook, Starsky & Hutch, Switch, Surfside 6, Wagon Train, The Waltons, Whispering Smith, Temple Houston, and more.

Death
Andre died in his Hollywood home at the age of 76 of cancer.

Filmography
A partial filmography follows.

Film

 The Ten Commandments (1956) as the Sheik of Hazerath
 Omar Khayyam (1957) as Nobleman (uncredited)
 Battle at Bloody Beach (1961) as Dr. Van Bart
 Red Nightmare (1962, Short) as Malenko (uncredited)
 Showdown (1963) as Station Master (uncredited)
 Mosby's Marauders (1967) as Uncle Ferd
 Tammy and the Millionaire (1967) as Jeremy (uncredited)
 The Shakiest Gun in the West (1968) as Will Banks (uncredited)
 The Arrangement (1969) as Uncle Joe
 The Lawyer (1970) as F.J. Williamson
 There Was a Crooked Man... (1970) as Judge (uncredited)
 Papillon (1973) as Old Con
 The Duchess and the Dirtwater Fox (1976) as Prospector
 Haunts (1976) as Doc
 Nickelodeon (1976) as Stage Performer
 Moonshine County Express (1977) as Lawyer Green
 The Lincoln Conspiracy (1977) as Rep. Thaddeus Stevens
 Magic (1978) as Merlin
 Nickle Mountain (1984) as Kuzitski
 Evil Town (1987) as Earl (final film role)

Television

 Peter Gun (1958) as Poet
 Shirley Temple's Storybook (1958) as Lama
 Whispering Smith (1961) as Philo Blanch
 Wagon Train (1961-1964)
 "The Patience Miller Story" as Mr. Wise 
 "The Geneva Balfour Story" as Simon Turpin
 87th Precinct (1962) as Sammy
 Bronco (1962) as Murdo
 Surfside 6 (1962) as Captain Willisett / Manager
 "Who Is Sylvia?" as Manager 
 "House on Boca Key" as Captain Willisett
 Death Valley Days (1962-1967)
 "The Private Mint of Clark, Gruber and Co." as Gus 
 "Along Came Mariana" as Domingo
 Bonanza (1962-1972)
 "The Long Night" as Prospector
 "A Passion for Justice" as Jeb
 "The Trouble with Trouble" as Judge
 "Shanklin" as Yost
 The Dakotas (1963) as Judge Langford
 Rawhide (1963, Episode: "Abilene") as Doctor
 77 Sunset Strip (1963) as Jenkins
 Temple Houston. (1963) as Judge Diversey
 The Virginian (1963-1968)
 "The Man Who Couldn't Die" as Alex
 "Ride a Dark Trail" as Cook
 "The Intruders" as Alex the Cook
 "A Slight Case of Charity" as Freight Agent
 "The Claim" as Cook
 "A Bad Place to Die" as Old Rancher
 "The Crooked Path" as Cookey
 Perry Mason (1964, Episode: "The Case of the Tragic Trophy") as Druggist
 The Alfred Hitchcock Hour (1965)
 "Where the Woodbine Twineth" as The Preacher
 "An Unlocked Window" as Sam Isles
 Burke's Law (1965) as Dr. Brenner
 The Wild Wild West (1965-1968)
 "The Night of a Thousand Eyes as The Proprietor
 "The Night of the Howling Light as Hospital Superintendent
 "The Night of the Doomsday Formula as Dr. Crane
 I Dream of Jeannie (1966) as Pierre Millay
 Blue Light (1966) as Albert Levaux
 The Fugitive (1966) as Old Man
 Laredo (1966) as Silversmith
 Shane (1966, Episode: "The Great Invasion") as Bullhead O'Reilly
 The Green Hornet (1967) as Paul
 The Big Valley (1967) as Sam Williams
 Petticoat Junction (1967) as Dr. Barton Stuart
 The Flying Nun (1968) as Diogenes
 Gunsmoke (1968-1972)
 "A Noose for Dobie Price" as Joe Karcher
 "Eleven Dollars" as Jeb Spencer
 Mannix (1969) as Professor Mario Carvello
 Night Gallery (1970) as Charlie Peterson (segment "The Little Black Bag")
 Cannon (1971) as Van Patten
 Nichols (1971)
 "Peanuts and Crackerjacks" as Hargut 
 "Ketcham Power" as Ed Hargut
 Adam 12 (1971-1973)
 "Log 106: Post Time" as Martin Endicott
 "Northwest Division" as Alex Mardigian
 Love American Style (1973) as Julius (segment "Love and the Baby Derby")
 The Day the Earth Moved (1974) as Henry Butler
 Harry O (1974) as The Old Man
 Miles to Go Before I Sleep (1975) as Mark
 The Waltons (1975) as Hyder Snow
 Starsky & Hutch (1975) as Jenson
 Switch (1976) as Floyd Warren
 Logan's Run (1977) as Martin
 Charlie's Angels (1977) as Wendell Muse
 Dallas (1979-1983) as Eugene Bullock
 "Return Engagements"
 "The Venezuelan Connection"
 "The Fourth Son"
 "Post Nuptial"
 "Barbecue Three"
 "Caribbean Connection"
 Greatest Heroes of the Bible (1979)
 Little House on the Prairie (1976-1982)
 "His Father's Son" as Amos Thoms
 "Going Home" as Matthew Simms
 "Gold Country" as Zachariah
 "The Godsister" as St. Peter
 "The Lost Ones (Part 1)" as Jed Cooper
 "Uncle Jed" as Jed Cooper
 Nero Wolfe (1981) as Maurice Koslow
 Quincy, M.E. (1982) as Sy Schuster 
 Mysterious Two (1982, TV Movie)

References

External links
 
 
 E. J. André at Turner Classic Movies

1908 births
1984 deaths
American male film actors
American male television actors
20th-century American male actors
American theatre directors
American male stage actors